The East 149th Street station is a local station on the IRT Pelham Line of the New York City Subway. It is served by the 6 train at all times and is located at the intersection of East 149th Street, Prospect Avenue, and Southern Boulevard in the Bronx. The station opened in 1919 as part of an extension of the Pelham Line of the Interborough Rapid Transit Company, and had its platforms extended in the 1960s. The station is slated to undergo renovations to become compliant with the Americans with Disabilities Act of 1990.

History 
This station opened on January 7, 1919, as part of an extension of the Pelham Line from Third Avenue–138th Street to Hunts Point Avenue by the Interborough Rapid Transit Company. The station was built as part of the Dual Contracts.

Both platforms were extended at the west (railroad south) end in the 1960s to accommodate the current standard length of an IRT train. The extensions are noticeable as they are narrower than the rest of the platforms and the trim line is maroon with "E 149TH ST" in white sans serif font. The extensions result in the platforms being slightly offset.

In 2019, the Metropolitan Transportation Authority announced that this station would become ADA-accessible as part of the agency's 2020–2024 Capital Program. A contract for two elevators at the station was awarded in December 2020.

Station layout

This underground station has three tracks and two side platforms. The center express track is used by the weekday peak direction <6> service.

Both platforms have their original Dual Contracts mosaic trim line and name tablets. "149" tablets for "East 149th Street" run along the trim line at regular intervals and the name tablets have "E. 149TH STREET" in all-caps, serif lettering. Yellow i-beam columns run along the platforms at either ends at regular intervals with every other one having the standard black name plate with white lettering.

There are no crossovers or crossunders to allow free transfers between directions. Closed newsstands on the platforms have been tiled over.

Exits
Both platforms have one same-level fare control area at the center. Each one has a turnstile bank, token booth, and two street stairs. The ones on the Pelham Bay Park-bound platform go up to the either southern corners of Southern Boulevard and East 149th Street while the ones on the Manhattan-bound platform go up to the northeast corner.

References

External links 

 
 Station Reporter — 6 Train
 East 149th Street entrance from Google Maps Street View
 Platforms from Google Maps Street View

149
New York City Subway stations in the Bronx
Railway stations in the United States opened in 1919
Longwood, Bronx